Meghmala Roy Education Centre  is an English-medium co-educational school located at Behala, Kolkata, India. The school offers education up to (10+2)standard. The school was established in 1991. The school is affiliated to the CISCE.

Student's Community

MREC Student's Community (Sanskrit: MREC छात्र समुदाय, Esperanto: MREC Studenta Komunumo, Bengali: ছাত্র সম্প্রদায়) is an upcoming unofficial organisation annonymusly announced. It is not affiliated with the school itself, but it's aim is to help the Students with study, sports, etc. It can be traced to another similar organization, called the Admins Union, which has one of the biggest Community on WhatsApp.

References 

Schools in Kolkata
Educational institutions established in 1991
1991 establishments in West Bengal